Israel competed at the 2019 Summer Universiade also known as the 30th Summer Universiade, in Naples, Italy.

Athletics

Men
Track & road events

Field events

Key
Q = Qualified for the next round
q = Qualified for the next round as a fastest loser or, in field events, by position without achieving the qualifying target
SB = Season Best
NM = No Mark
DNS = Did No Start

Basketball

Men's tournament

Roster

|}
|valign="top" |
 Head Coach
 Oded Kattash
 Legend
Club – describes lastclub on 4 July 2019
Age – describes ageon 4 July 2019
|}
Source: Universiade2019Napoli.it

Preliminary round

|}

Quarterfinals

Semifinals

Bronze medal game

Fencing

Men

Women

Judo

Men

Swimming

Men

Women

References

Summer Universiade
Nations at the 2019 Summer Universiade
Israel at the Summer Universiade